The Vernon Boulevard–Jackson Avenue station (often informally referred to as Vernon–Jackson station; formerly Vernon–Jackson Avenues station) is a station on the IRT Flushing Line of the New York City Subway, and the westernmost station on the Flushing Line in Queens. It is served by the 7 train at all times and the <7> train rush hours in the peak direction. Despite its name, the station is not quite located at the intersection of Vernon Boulevard and Jackson Avenue. It is located on 50th Avenue between Vernon Boulevard and Jackson Avenue, both of which have entrances to the station.

History 
The Dual Contracts were formalized in early 1913, specifying new lines or expansions to be built by the Interborough Rapid Transit Company (IRT) and the Brooklyn Rapid Transit Company (BRT). The Dual Contracts involved opening the Steinway Tunnel as part of the new Flushing subway line. The route was to go from Times Square in Manhattan, passing through the tunnel to Long Island City in Queens, then continuing toward Flushing from there. The tunnel, with trolley loops on both the Manhattan and Queens sides, had sat unused since 1907, when test runs had been performed in the then-nearly-complete tunnel. The Queens trolley loop was near Vernon Avenue (now Vernon Boulevard) in Long Island City.

The Vernon–Jackson Avenues station opened on June 22, 1915, as a terminal for shuttle trains going into Manhattan via the Steinway Tunnel until the line was extended to Hunters Point Avenue on February 5, 1916. A westerly extension of the Manhattan-bound platform opened for service on December 20, 1923.

The city government took over the IRT's operations on June 12, 1940. The IRT routes were given numbered designations in 1948 with the introduction of "R-type" rolling stock, which contained rollsigns with numbered designations for each service. The route from Times Square to Flushing became known as the 7. In 1949, the New York City Board of Transportation announced that the Flushing Line platforms would be lengthened to 11 IRT car lengths; the platforms were only able to fit nine 51-foot-long IRT cars beforehand. The platforms at the station were extended in 1955–1956 to accommodate 11-car trains. However, nine-car trains continued to run on the 7 route until 1962, when they were extended to ten cars.

In 1981, the MTA listed the station among the 69 most deteriorated stations in the subway system.

1997 station agent murder
In 1997, this station was the site of a night station agent being killed for subway tokens. The result of this incident was a change in policy where night station agents do not have to empty the turnstiles after the evening station agent leaves unless police, a supervisor, or another employee is present (and that is left to the option of the station agent). Since the introduction of the MetroCard, this process remains the same. Two armed NYCT guards clear the vending machines.

Station layout

This underground station has two side platforms and two tracks. A black wall separates the two tracks for most of the station.

Both platforms have a line of yellow columns along their edges. Most of these are normal I-beam columns, but in the middle of the platforms, cream colored arches, which is also the color of the station's ceiling, starting at about four feet off the ground support a short section of the columns. The platform walls have a mosaic gold and brown trim line on top while the name tablets are mosaic white with white text reading "Vernon-Jackson Ave's" (erroneous if the use is considered in the possessive context, but it can also be considered as a contractional form of the plural) on a brown background and gold and brown border. There are also a few directional signs to the station's fare control areas reading "Vernon Ave" or "Jackson Ave" with an arrow beneath.

Exits
Each platform has two same-level fare control areas and there are no crossovers or crossunders connecting the platforms. The full-time fare control areas are just west of the middle of the platforms, though only the Manhattan-bound platform still has a token booth. Each area has a small regular turnstile bank and two staircases to the street, the northeast corner of Vernon Boulevard and 50th Avenue for the Manhattan-bound platform and the southwest corner for the Flushing-bound platform. The southern staircase's steel fencing does not have the standard black sign saying what station this is and what trains serve it.

Each platform also has a larger, unstaffed fare control on their extreme east (railroad north) ends. On the Manhattan-bound platform, a wide, but short staircase goes up to some High Entry/Exit Turnstiles that lead to two street stairs, one to each northern corners of 50th Avenue and Jackson Avenue. This entrance at one time had a part-time token booth and regular turnstiles. The Flushing-bound platform has a similar arrangement with short staircase to a wide intermediate landing with an exit-only turnstile at each corner. Outside the turnstiles is a single street stair, each going up to each southern corners of 50th Avenue and Jackson Avenue.

References

External links 

 
 Station Reporter — 7 Train
 The Subway Nut — Vernon Boulevard–Jackson Avenue Pictures
 Vernon Boulevard entrance from Google Maps Street View
 Jackson Avenue entrance from Google Maps Street View
 Southbound platform from Google Maps Street View
 Northbound platform from Google Maps Street View

IRT Flushing Line stations
New York City Subway stations in Queens, New York
Railway stations in the United States opened in 1915
1915 establishments in New York City
Long Island City